Cyphoma mcgintyi is a species of sea snail, a marine gastropod mollusk in the family Ovulidae, the ovulids, cowry allies or false cowries.

This species has become a synonym of Cyphoma gibbosum (Linnaeus, 1758)

Distribution

Description 
The maximum recorded shell length is 39.5 mm.

Habitat 
Minimum recorded depth is 0.8 m. Maximum recorded depth is 90 m.

References

External links

Ovulidae
Gastropods described in 1939